Maarten Pouwels (born 28 August 1998) is a Dutch professional footballer who plays as a forward for Eerste Divisie club Almere City.

Club career
Prior to his move to Go Ahead Eagles in July 2018, Pouwels had progressed through the ranks at amateur side, SV Dalfsen. He signed in 2005, at the age of seven, and made his first-team debut in 2016. On 17 August 2018, Pouwels marked his professional debut with a goal during Go Ahead Eagles' 5–0 thrashing of Utrecht II, converting a cross from fellow new signing, Jaroslav Navrátil, with eight minutes remaining.

Career statistics

References

External links
 

1998 births
Living people
People from Dalfsen
Association football forwards
Dutch footballers
Eerste Divisie players
Go Ahead Eagles players
SC Cambuur players
Almere City FC players
Footballers from Overijssel